CCR4-NOT transcription complex subunit 1 is a protein that in humans is encoded by the CNOT1 gene.

It is a part of the CCR4-Not complex, which deadenylates mRNAs.  CNOT1 acts as a scaffold protein, binding other subunits of the complex.

Interactions 

CNOT1 has been shown to interact with CNOT8.

References

Further reading

External links